Evelyn Sandberg-Vavalà ( Evelyn May Graham Sandberg; 1888 - 8 September 1961), also known by her married name as Evelyn Kendrew, was a British art historian who studied iconography in the Italian Renaissance.

She published a book on Italian Painted Crucifixes and the Iconography of the Passion in 1929, and curated her 25,000 image photographic archive of gothic and renaissance Italian paintings, now in Fondazione Giorgio Cini, Venice.

Career

Sandberg studied geography and taught in a girls' grammar school and at a university college before moving to Florence in 1921, where she studied art history under Bernard Berenson. In 1926, she published her first book in Italian on the Veronese primitive art of the 14th and 15th centuries. Her Italian language book on Italian Painted Crucifixes and the Iconography of the Passion was published in 1929, and another on the iconography of the virgin and child in the 13th century in 1934. Later works included Uffizi Studies: The Development of the Florentine School of Painting (1948), Sienese studies: the development of the school of painting of Siena (1953) and Studies in Florentine Churches (1959).

Sandberg-Vavalà also wrote articles for The Burlington Magazine and the College Art Association's Art Bulletin. She acted as a guide and tutor to students of art in the Uffizzi Gallery and in her home and accompanied them on visits throughout Italy. Although never financially secure, she had collected an archive of images of art works that she shared with her students. She returned to England during World War II and worked for the Oxford University Gramophone Society, which provided a lending library (10,000 classical records per annum). She briefly tutored Henry Clifford, and Marvin Eisenberg, who dedicated a 14th or 15th century choir book page donated to the Michigan Museum of Art in her memory.

Her knowledge and teaching were recognised in her obituary in the Burlington Magazine by John Pope-Hennessy and in the London Times by Hugh Honour, and her analysis is still occasionally referenced in the 21st century by art galleries or auctioneers.

Personal life 
Evelyn May Graham Sandberg was born in 1888 in Compton, Berkshire but her birth was registered in Wantage (then Berkshire, now Oxfordshire). She was the only child of Rev George Alfred Sandberg (1848-1910), born in Benares, India, vicar of Ss Mary and Nicholas Church, Westhide Parish, and Annie Sandberg (1858-1894). Evelyn's mother died when her daughter was six years old. She and her father then moved to Bournemouth. She attended  the Society of Oxford Home Students (later became St Anne's College), studying geography and geomorphology. She became a geography teacher at Bradford Girls' Grammar School in 1912.

Two years later she married Wilfrid Kendrew and moved to teaching geography at University College, Reading for a male lecturer who was on war service from 1915 to 1916. Their son, John, later Sir John Cowdery Kendrew (1962 co-winner of the Nobel Prize for Chemistry), was born on 24 March 1917. She tried to leave the country with her son, when he was four, but was prevented from doing so by her husband, who formally divorced her in 1921.

She moved to Florence, and lived there for 35 years, taking the nom de plume Evelyn Sandberg-Vavalà, apart from a few years during World War II. She reconnected with her son when he was at boarding school and they developed a relationship later in her life, when he visited her in Italy and supported her financially.

Sandberg-Vavalà converted to Catholicism and was cared for in her last illness by nuns, dying of lung disease on 8 September 1961. She is buried in the cemetery of Moggiona, Commune di Poppi, Tuscany.

Legacy 

One major Sandberg-Vavalà bequest is an archive of 25,000 of her photographs and other materials which she had personally curated and catalogued, aiming to cover all known gothic and renaissance paintings in Italy.

She wrote in July 1961, before she died, proposing to sell this to what became the Fondazioni Giorgio Cini, located on the island of San Giorgio Maggiore, Venice. Professor Ulrich Middledorf dealt with her archive, legal and financial matters to establish this, on Sandberg-Vavalà's death. A section of her collection was also added to Frederico Zeri's photography archive in Bologna, Zeri managed the materials so as to integrate it into his own catalogue, and materials also went to the Kunsthistorisches Institut in Florence.

Selected publications 
 Evelyn Sandberg-Vavalà (1926). La pittura veronese del trecento e del primo quattrocento. OCLC 860574931
Evelyn Sandberg-Vavalà (1929). La croce dipinta italiana e l'iconografia della passione . Verona: Casa editrice Apollo. OCLC 988246477
 Evelyn Sandberg-Vavalà (1935). "Giovanni Bellini by Luitpold Düssler". Art Bulletin.
Robert Salvini & Evelyn Sandberg-Vavalà (1936). "L'arte di Agnolo Gaddi" Art Bulletin.
Evelyn Sandberg-Vavalà & Allen Weller (1938). "Giovanni di Paolo by John Pope-Hennessy", Art Bulletin.
Evelyn Sandberg-Vavalà (1948). Uffizi Studies. The Development of the Florentine School of Painting. Pp. xvi. 304. Florence: Leo S. Olschki. OCLC 504664455.

See also 
 Master of the Franciscan Crucifixes
 Turone da Verona
 Alberto Sotio

References

External links 
 

British art historians
Women art historians
Alumni of the University of Oxford
People from Berkshire
People from Bournemouth
1888 births
1961 deaths
Date of birth missing
Place of death missing
British expatriates in Italy